Daniel Benjamin Adams (born 3 January 1976) is an English former professional footballer who played as a defender.

Career
Adams turned professional in 1999 and played for clubs including Macclesfield Town, Stockport County and Huddersfield Town.

On 12 January 2007, the Huddersfield manager Peter Jackson told Adams along with two other teammates (Paweł Abbott and Martin McIntosh) that they were for sale. After telling this to the players, Peter Jackson told them to keep quiet about this but Adams thought that this was wrong and he told BBC Radio Leeds later that night. As a result of that Adams was then dropped from the first-team for the game against Cheltenham Town the next day and his contract was cancelled by mutual agreement on 23 January.

On 21 February 2007, Adams joined his former boss at Stockport, Sammy McIlroy, at then Conference side Morecambe on a deal until the end of the 2006–07 season. Following their promotion to League Two, Adams signed a two-year contract at the club. He was released in March 2010 and joined Conference North promotion hopefuls Stalybridge Celtic on 8 March. Adams joined Northern Premier League side Nantwich Town for the start of the 2010/11 season, moving on to Northern Premier League Division One North neighbours Witton Albion in December 2010. He has since retired as a footballer.

Career statistics

References

1976 births
Living people
English footballers
Footballers from Manchester
Association football fullbacks
Altrincham F.C. players
Macclesfield Town F.C. players
Morecambe F.C. players
Stockport County F.C. players
Huddersfield Town A.F.C. players
Stalybridge Celtic F.C. players
Nantwich Town F.C. players
Witton Albion F.C. players
English Football League players
National League (English football) players